The Yakovlev Yak-40 (NATO reporting name: Codling) is a regional jet designed by Yakovlev. The trijet's maiden flight was in 1966, and it was in production from 1967 to 1981. Introduced in September 1968, the Yak-40 has been exported since 1970.

Development
By the early 1960s, Soviet international and internal trunk routes were served by Aeroflot, the state airline, using jet or turboprop powered airliners, but their local services, many of which operated from grass airfields, were served by obsolete piston-engine aircraft such as the Ilyushin Il-12, Il-14 and Lisunov Li-2. Aeroflot wanted to replace these elderly airliners with a turbine-powered aircraft, with the Yakovlev design bureau being assigned to design it. High speed was not required, but it would have to be able to operate safely and reliably out of poorly equipped airports with short (less than 700 m or 2,300 ft) unpaved runways in poor weather.

Yakovlev studied both turboprop and jet-powered designs to meet the requirement, including Vertical Take-Off and Landing designs with lift jets in the fuselage or in wing-mounted pods, but eventually they settled on a straight-winged tri-jet carrying 20 to 25 passengers. The engines were to be the new AI-25 turbofan being developed by Ivchenko at Zaporozhye in Ukraine.

Design

The Yak-40 is a low-winged cantilever monoplane with unswept wings, a large T-tail and a retractable tricycle landing gear. The passenger cabin is ahead of the wing, with the short rear fuselage carrying the three turbofan engines, with two engines mounted on short pylons on the side of the fuselage and a third engine in the rear fuselage, with air fed from a dorsal air-intake by an "S-duct", as is an auxiliary power unit, fitted to allow engine start-up without ground support on primitive airfields. The three AI-25 engines are two-shaft engines rated at 14.7 kN (3,300 lbf). The engines have no jetpipes, and initially no thrust reversers.

The pressurized fuselage has a diameter of 2.4 metres (94 in). Pilot and co-pilot sit side by side in the aircraft's flight deck, while the passenger cabin has a standard layout seating 24 to 27 passengers three-abreast, although 32 passengers can be carried by switching to four-abreast seating. Passengers enter the aircraft via a set of ventral airstairs in the rear fuselage.

The wing is fitted with large trailing-edge slotted flaps, but has no other high-lift devices, relying on the aircraft's low wing loading to give the required short-field take-off and landing performance. The wings join at the aircraft centerline, with the main spar running from wingtip to wingtip. The wings house integral fuel tanks with a capacity of 3,800 litres (1,000 US gal; 840 imp gal). The aircraft has a large fin, which is swept back at an angle of 50 degrees to move the tailplane rearwards to compensate for the short rear fuselage. The horizontal tailplane itself is unswept.

The Yak-40 was the first Soviet-built airliner designed to Western airworthiness requirements.

Operational history
The first of five prototypes made its maiden flight on 21 October 1966, with production being launched at the Saratov Aviation Plant in 1967 and Soviet type certification granted in 1968. The type carried out its first passenger service for Aeroflot on 30 September 1968. In the 1972 version, a tailspin was removed. In 1974, new version was introduced, with non-stop flight distance increased. Also, the forward door on the right side of the fuselage changed its place – it was located together with the sixth window.

In 1975, the last upgrade of Yak-40 took place – the number of cabin windows on the right side changed from nine to eight.

By the time production ended in November 1981, the factory at Saratov had produced 1,011 or 1,013 aircraft. By 1993 Yak-40s operated by Aeroflot had carried 354 million passengers. As well as being the backbone of Aeroflot's local operations, flying to 276 domestic destinations in 1980, the Yak-40 was also an export success. In addition to this, Yak-40 became the first Russian/Soviet aircraft to get flying certificates from Italy and West Germany. It was demonstrated in 75 countries of the world, including the US, where orders for the Yak-40 were made.

A total of 130 were exported to Afghanistan, Angola, Bulgaria, Cambodia, Cuba, Czechoslovakia, Equatorial Guinea, Ethiopia, Germany, Guatemala, Honduras, Hungary, Italy, Laos, Madagascar, Philippines, Poland, Syria, Vietnam, Yugoslavia and Zambia.

As of July 2021, a Yak-40 has begun testing with an electric propeller engine in the nose of the aircraft.

Variants
Data from:- OKB Yakovlev
 Yak-40 – The first production model.
 Yak-40-25 Military conversion with the nose of a MiG-25R and SRS-4A Elint installation.
 Yak-40 Akva (Aqua) – Military conversion with nose probe, pylon-mounted sensors, a fuselage dispenser and underwing active jammer pods.
 Yak-40D (Dal'niy – long-distance) – with non-stop flight distance enlarged.
 Yak-40EC – Export version.
 Yak-40 Fobos (Phobos) – Military conversion with two dorsal viewing domes and a removable window on each side.
 Yak-40K – cargo / convertible / combi version with a large freight door. Produced in 1975–81.
 Yak-40 Kalibrovshchik – Military Elint conversion with a "farm" of blade, dipole and planar antennas.
 Yak-40L – Proposed version with two Lycoming LF507-1N turbofans, a joint program between Skorost and Textron (now Allied-Signal) Lycoming. The original design would have had a slightly swept wing.
 Yak-40 Liros – Military conversion with nose probe carrying air-data sensors.
 Yak-40M – Proposed 40-seat stretched passenger version.
 Yak-40 M-602 – Flying testbed with a Czechoslovak M 602 turboprop installed in the nose.
 Yak-40 Meteo – Military conversion with multipole dipole antennas and fuselage dispenser.
 Yak-40P – Yak-40L with large nacelles projecting ahead of the wings.
 Yak-40REO – Military conversion with large ventral canoe for IR linescan. Lateral observation blister on right side.
 Yak-40 Shtorm – Military conversion with multiple probes and sensors on the forward sidewalls.
 Yak-40TL – Proposed upgraded version, to be powered by three Lycoming LF 507 turbofan engines.
 Yak-40V – Export version powered by three AI-25T turbofan engines.
 Yak-40MS – Experimental upgrade with two Honeywell TFE731-5 turbofan engines by SibNIA.
 STR-40DT – A proposed twin-engine composite-wing derivative along the line of TVS-2DTS, also being developed by SibNIA. Endorsed, but not supported by Yakovlev.

Operators

Civilian operators

As of July 2019, a total of 22 out of 1011 Yakovlev Yak-40 aircraft remained in service with civil operators. The airworthiness of several Yak-40 of smaller Russian and Central Asian charter airlines is uncertain, as is the whereabouts of one Air Libya Tibesti aircraft after the civil war. Most aircraft in service today have been reconfigured for VIP-charter services, with fewer than ten remaining in scheduled passenger service. Known operators are:

Military operators

As of November 2012 no more than 17 Yak-40 remain in military service (possibly fewer, with the unclear situation in Syria). Known operators are:

Accidents and incidents

Specifications (Yak-40)

See also

References

Bibliography

 
 Gordon, Yefim, Dmitry Komissarov and Sergey Komissarov. OKB Yakovlev: A History of the Design Bureau and its Aircraft. Hinkley, UK: Midland Publishing, 2005. .
 Gunston, Bill. The Osprey Encyclopedia of Russian Aircraft 1875–1995. London:Osprey, 1995. .
 Gunston, Bill and Yefim Gordon. Yakovlev Aircraft since 1924. London, UK: Putnam Aeronautical Books, 1997. .
 Hoyle, Craig. "World Air Forces Directory". Flight International. Vol. 190, No. 5566, 6–12 December 2016, pp. 22–53. .
 Ottenhof, Guus;  Hillman, Peter and Jessup, Stuart. Soviet Transports. Aviation Hobby World. 1996. . 
 Stroud, John. Soviet Transport Aircraft since 1945. London:Putnam, 1968. .
 Thisdell, Dan and Seymour, Chris. "World Airliner Census". Flight International, Vol. 196, No. 5694, 30 July–5 August 2019. . pp. 24–47.
 Taylor, John W. R. Jane's All The World's Aircraft 1976–77. London:Jane's Yearbooks, 1976. .

External links

 List of all Yak-40 aircraft used by Polish Air Force
 Watch a video of the plane in action
 Walkaround Yak-40 (Kyiv's Aviation Museum, Ukraine)
 
 *

1960s Soviet airliners
Yak-040
Trijets
T-tail aircraft
Aircraft first flown in 1966
Low-wing aircraft